Alessio is a mostly Italian male name, Italian form of Alexius.

Individuals with the given name Alessio

Alessio Ascalesi (1872–1952), Italian cardinal
Alessio Boni (born 1966), Italian actor
Alessio Cerci (born 1987), Italian footballer
Alessio Cragno (born 1994), Italian footballer
Alessio Da Cruz (born 1997), Dutch footballer
Alessio Deledda (born 1994), Italian racing driver
Alessio Di Chirico (born 1989), Italian martial artist
Alessio di Giovanni (1872-1946), Italian poet
Alessio di Savino (born 1984), Italian boxer
Alessio Donnarumma (born 1998), Italian footballer
Alessio Figalli (born 1984), Italian mathematician (Fields medalist)
Alessio Locatelli (born 1978), Italian footballer
Alessio Lorandi (born 1998), Italian racing driver
Alessio Morosin (born 1955), Italian lawyer
Alessio Riccardi (born 2001), Italian footballer
Miguel Alessio Robles, Mexican lawyer
Vito Alessio Robles (1879–1957), Mexican general
Alessio Romagnoli (born 1995), Italian footballer
Alessio Sakara (born 1981), Italian martial artist
Alessio Sestu (born 1983), Italian footballer
Alessio Tacchinardi (born 1975), Italian footballer

Individuals with the surname Alessio
Angelo Alessio (born 1965), Italian football coach
Carlo Luciano Alessio (1919–2006), Italian mycologist
Harry Alessio (1895–1973), former Australian rules footballer
Steven Alessio (born 1971), former Australian rules footballer
Dom Alessio (born 1983), Australian radio personality
John Alessio (born 1979), Canadian professional mixed martial artist
Simone Alessio (born 2000), Italian taekwondo athlete

Italian masculine given names
Italian-language surnames
Patronymic surnames